Rusty Farley (September 25, 1953 – July 4, 2011) was a Republican politician from Oklahoma. Farley was the Representative for District 1 in the Oklahoma House of Representatives. House District 1 encompasses all but the far northwestern corner of McCurtain County (the only county in the district), located in the southeastern corner of the state.

Political History
An 18-year member of the Haworth school board, Farley was unsuccessful in his 2008 bid for the seat, losing to Dennis Bailey.

Farley ran unopposed in the 2010 primary and once again faced Bailey for the District 1 seat. Farley upset the incumbent in a District where 81 percent of the residents are registered Democrats. Even more shocking was his political financing – Farley raised a grand total of only $170 and spent only $70 on a single newspaper ad.

Death
Farley died on July 4, 2011 from a pulmonary embolism at a Paris, Texas hospital. He was 57 years old.

References

1953 births
2011 deaths
Republican Party members of the Oklahoma House of Representatives
School board members in Oklahoma
People from Sequoyah County, Oklahoma
Deaths from aneurysm
People from McCurtain County, Oklahoma
21st-century American politicians
Cherokee Nation state legislators in Oklahoma